Chandamama is 1999 Indian Malayalam-language Black comedy film directed by Murali Krishnan and written by Rajan Kiriyath, starring Kunchako Boban, Tejali Ghanekar, Jagathi Sreekumar, Sudheesh and Kalabhavan Navas.It is loosely based on 1989 American comedy film Weekend at Bernie's directed by Ted Kotcheff.

Plot
Three friends, Unni, Dasan and Monayi, find their boss Eapachan murdered by hired killers. Believing that people will suspect them for the murder, they present the boss's dead body as if he is alive. They make others believe that he is alive. In the end they find out who the murderer is and get him arrested.

Cast

Soundtrack
Music: Ouseppachan, Lyrics: Kaithapram Damodaran Namboothiri

 "Aakaashakkottayile" - Ouseppachan, Malaysia Vasudevan
 "Chandamama" - M. G. Sreekumar, K. S. Chitra
 "Chiriyoonjaal" (M) - K. J. Yesudas
 "Chiriyoonjaal" (F) - K. S. Chitra
 "Rojaappoo Kavilathu" (F) - Sujatha Mohan
 "Rojaappoo Kavilathu" (D) - Sujatha Mohan, Unni Menon
 "Unaroo" - Version I - K. J. Yesudas
 "Unaroo" - Version II - M. G. Sreekumar, Chorus

References

External links
 
 

1990s Malayalam-language films
Indian black comedy films
Indian remakes of American films
1999 films
Films scored by Ouseppachan